Egbert I (died 11 January 1068) was the Margrave of Meissen from 1067 until his early death the next year. Egbert was the Count of Brunswick from about 1038, when his father, Liudolf, Margrave of Frisia, died. His mother was Gertrude, the sister of Pope Leo IX.

Egbert was the scion of the influential Eastphalian family of the Brunonen. He inherited the familial lands in Brunswick and from about 1051 he shared the chief authority in the region with the Bishop of Hildesheim. Egbert also extended his authority and estates into Frisia under the suzerainty of the Archbishop of Hamburg-Bremen.

Although closely related to the Salian dynasty, Egbert participated in the coup d'état of Kaiserswerth in 1062, whereat a group of nobles acting under Anno II, Archbishop of Cologne, tried to seize authority in the kingdom from King Henry IV and his regent mother, the Empress Agnes.

In 1058, Egbert married Immilla, the daughter of Ulric Manfred II of Turin, and widow of Otto of Schweinfurt. Egbert tried to repudiate Immilla shortly before his death in 1068. His only son, Egbert II, succeeded him in Meissen. His daughter Gertrude later brought Meissen to her husband, Henry von Eilenburg.

References

Sources
 

1068 deaths
Egbert 01
Medieval Frisian rulers
Brunonids
Counts of Brunswick
Year of birth unknown